AMEX, AmEx or Amex may refer to:

American Experience, a television program
American Express, a global financial services corporation
Falmer Stadium known for sponsorship reasons as the American Express Community Stadium, an association football stadium in Brighton, England, currently sponsored by American Express
American Stock Exchange

See also

Amax (disambiguation)
Mex (disambiguation) ie. A mex